Faizal bin Saari (born 13 January 1991) is a Malaysian field hockey player. Currently playing as a striker for Terengganu Hockey Team.

Career

Club
Faizal started his Malaysia Hockey League career with Terengganu Hockey Team. He was the 2011 league top goalscorer with 19 goals.

In June 2011, Faizal started his overseas career along with another Malaysian Sukri Mutalib. They were selected by the Southern Hotshots team for the Australian Hockey League. He represented Southern Hotshots in the ten matches league. He scored three goals in five matches for Southern Hotshots. He also played in the Adelaide League and made seven strikes for Forestville Hockey Club in three appearances.

In 2012, he returned to Tenaga Nasional Berhad Hockey Club and earned the top goalscorer award with 20 goals. While playing for Tenaga Nasional Berhad, he received an offer to play in the Spanish Division One for Atlètic Terrassa Hockey Club.

After the 2012 season ended, Faizal was bought over by Mumbai Magicians for US$26,000 (MYR79,560) in an auction to feature in the Hockey India League. He is the highest paid hockey player in Malaysia, followed by Kumar Subramaniam who featured for Uttar Pradesh Wizards after being bought over for US$15,000 (MYR45,900). However he had a miserable outing in the HIL firing blanks in all 12 matches.

International
Faizal made his national senior team debut in the Champions Challenge II in Dublin in 2009 at age of 18. He was the members of the Malaysian squad that won the silver medal in the 2010 Asian Games. He also part of Malaysia youth team that won the 2012 Asian Hockey Youth Cup. He scored one of the two goals in the final against Pakistan.

Faizal was the leading goal scorer at the 2018 Asian Men's Hockey Champions Trophy where he finished with 8 goals. Malaysia finished at the 3rd place after defeating Japan 3–2 in the penalty shootouts in the bronze medal match.

References

External links

1991 births
Living people
Malaysian people of Malay descent
People from Kelantan
Malaysian male field hockey players
Male field hockey forwards
Field hockey players at the 2010 Asian Games
2014 Men's Hockey World Cup players
Field hockey players at the 2018 Asian Games
2018 Men's Hockey World Cup players
Asian Games medalists in field hockey
Medalists at the 2018 Asian Games
Asian Games silver medalists for Malaysia
Medalists at the 2010 Asian Games
Expatriate field hockey players
Malaysian expatriates in Australia
Malaysian expatriates in India
Hockey India League players
Southeast Asian Games gold medalists for Malaysia
Southeast Asian Games medalists in field hockey
Competitors at the 2017 Southeast Asian Games
2023 Men's FIH Hockey World Cup players